Tubney is a small village in Oxfordshire, England (in Berkshire until 1974).

History
Tubney was first mentioned in 955, when it was included in land granted to Abingdon Abbey. The abbey retained the overlordship of the manor throughout the Middle Ages. In 1479, the manor was granted to William Waynflete, Bishop of Winchester, for the foundation of Magdalen College, his new college at Oxford. The college has retained the manor ever since.  The medieval settlement was over a mile northeast of the modern village, near the village of Appleton.   The medieval settlement was deserted by the 16th century. The site is marked by the remains of a medieval moat at Tubney Manor Farm. 

Nothing remains of the medieval church, although its graveyard could still be seen in the early 20th century. Although there was no parish church, the parish had a parson, to whom Magdalen College was paying a stipend of £44 a year in the 17th century.  In the 18th century it was reported that the incumbents were inducted under a hawthorn bush.  The modern site of Tubney was settled from the 17th century.  Tubney became a civil parish in 1866. In 1952 the parish was merged with Fyfield to create the civil parish of Fyfield and Tubney.

Notable buildings
Tubney House, a 17th-century Grade II listed building, is now the headquarters of the Wildlife Conservation Research Unit (WildCRU), part of the Department of Zoology at the University of Oxford.

A new church, designed by A. W. N. Pugin and dedicated to St Lawrence of Rome, was consecrated in 1847, with a font given by Queen Adelaide.

References

External links

Villages in Oxfordshire
Former civil parishes in Oxfordshire